Into the Rush is the debut studio album by American pop rock duo Aly & AJ.  The album was released on August 16, 2005, by Disney-owned label Hollywood Records. The album features 14 tracks, including the singles "Rush" and "Do You Believe in Magic". A deluxe edition of the album was released on August 8, 2006, featuring three all new songs, two new mixes of previous songs, and a bonus DVD.

The album generally received positive reviews from critics and became a commercial success. Into the Rush had sold over 839,000 copies as of June 2013, and was certified Gold for sales over 500,000 copies on March 20, 2006. The album sold 1,000,000 copies worldwide. The album, combined with the sales of the Deluxe Edition, became one of the top best-selling albums in the United States in 2006; Into the Rush ranked at number 112 on the Billboard 200 Albums end-of-year charts of 2006.

Chart performance 
Into the Rush debuted at number 36, selling 25,000 copies in its first week. The album spent 40 weeks on the Billboard 200. The album's last position was 123 before falling off the next week. The album was selling more than 25,000 copies a week for nearly 30 weeks. The album sold 839,000 copies in the United States and 1,000,000 worldwide.

Singles
"Do You Believe in Magic" was released as the duo's debut single on February 15, 2005. A cover of The Lovin' Spoonful's 1965 debut single, the song was featured in the Disney Channel Original Movie Now You See It... which starred Aly Michalka. It received airplay on Radio Disney and also saw a physical CD single release. The single peaked at number two on the Billboard Hot Singles Sales chart. A music video for the song was released in February 2005 and received heavy rotation on Disney Channel. "No One" was released as a single on March 18, 2005, and received airplay on Radio Disney. The song was featured in the 2005 Walt Disney Pictures film Ice Princess as well as on its accompanying soundtrack. A music video was released in March 2005 featuring scenes from Ice Princess, along with shots of the duo performing the song. "Walking on Sunshine", a cover of the Katrina and the Waves song, was released as a single on June 22, 2005, and received airplay on Radio Disney. The song was featured in the 2005 Walt Disney Pictures film Herbie: Fully Loaded, as well as on its accompanying soundtrack. A music video for the song was released in June 2005 showing the duo arriving at a set and performing the song in front of the shooting crew.

Following the album's release on August 16, 2005, "Never Far Behind" was released as a single on October 10. It was released to Christian Adult Contemporary and Christian Contemporary Hit Radio formats, making it the duo's first single to be released outside of Radio Disney. It peaked at number 28 on the Billboard Hot Christian Songs chart. The song was originally written and recorded for a companion album to the film The Chronicles of Narnia: The Lion, The Witch and The Wardrobe, but the album was scrapped. The song was added to the edition of the album sent to Christian music retailers and was later included on the Deluxe Edition of the album in 2006. On February 28, 2006, "Rush" was the first single to be released in promotion of the album. It was the duo's first single the be sent to mainstream radio. The song's accompanying music video was directed by Marc Webb and was released on February 15, 2006. The song was their first to chart on the Billboard Hot 100, peaking at number 59. "On the Ride" was released as a single on March 7, 2006. It was featured in the Disney Channel Original Movie Cow Belles, starring Aly & AJ. Its music video incorporates scenes from the film. "Chemicals React" was released as a single on June 27, 2006, to promote the deluxe edition of the album. Its music video was directed by Chris Applebaum and features Aly & AJ performing the song on a set-up stage. The song peaked at number 50 on the Billboard Hot 100.

Critical reception

The album received mixed to positive reviews from critics. Fran Grauman from about.com gave the album a 4 star rating, praising Aly and AJ's "ton of talent" and "experience." AllMusic gave the album a mixed review, saying it "doesn't venture further than offering a few empowering ballads", to hand them 2.5 stars after. AMG does praise them for having a real singing ability, citing "Aly & AJ can actually sing — their vocals have more way personality than prefab Disney hopefuls like Hayden Panettiere or Caleigh Peters — and the arrangements are slick without resorting to flashily empty pap". The review finishes with "Into the Rush is listenable, likeable, and more about being memorable than being Disney product."

Track listing

Notes
  signifies an additional producer

Personnel

Credits adapted from the deluxe edition's liner notes

 Aly Michalka – vocals (all tracks)
 AJ Michalka – vocals (all tracks)
 Tim James – production (tracks 1–5, 13, 15), mixing (tracks 1–5, 13, 15)
 Tim Pierce – guitar (tracks 1–7, 9–15)
 Sean Hurley – bass (tracks 1–7, 9, 11, 12, 14, 15)
 Jon Lind – mixing (tracks 6, 7, 9–12, 14), additional production (tracks 7, 10), executive production
 Antonina Armato – production (tracks 1–5, 13, 15), mixing (tracks 13, 15)
 Dan James – production (tracks 6, 7, 9, 11, 12, 14), additional production (track 5)
 Leah Haywood – production (tracks 6, 7, 9, 11, 12, 14), additional production (track 5)
 Adam Watts – production & keyboards (tracks 8, 10), mixing (track 8), drums & acoustic guitar (track 10)
 Nigel Lundemo – engineering (tracks 1–5), drum programming (tracks 2, 4)
 Brian Reeves – mixing (tracks 6, 7, 9–12, 14)
 Dorian Crozier – drums (tracks 1–5, 13, 15)
 Andy Dodd – production & electric guitar (tracks 8, 10), mixing (track 8), keyboards (track 10)
 John Robinson – drums (tracks 6, 7, 9, 11, 12, 14)
 Paul Palmer – mixing (tracks 1–5)
 Ross Hogarth – engineering (tracks 1, 2, 5)
 Jamie Muhoberac – keyboards (tracks 2, 4, 5)
 Matthew Gerrard – production (tracks 16, 17)
 Krish Sharma – mixing (tracks 16, 17)
 Scott Warren – string arrangement (track 2)
 David J. Carpenter – bass (track 8)
 Chevy Martinez – bass (track 13)

Charts

Weekly charts

Year-end charts

Sales and certifications

Release history

References

2005 debut albums
Aly & AJ albums
Albums produced by Dreamlab
Albums produced by Matthew Gerrard
Albums produced by Rock Mafia
Hollywood Records albums